Iran competed at the 2011 World Aquatics Championships in Shanghai, China between July 16 and 31, 2011.

Swimming

Iran qualified 3 swimmers.

Men

References

Nations at the 2011 World Aquatics Championships
2011 in Iranian sport
Iran at the World Aquatics Championships